Tung Chao-yung or C. Y. Tung (28 September 1912 – 15 April 1982), also known as Tung Hao-yun), was a Chinese shipping magnate, the founder of the Orient Overseas Line (now Orient Overseas Container Line or OOCL). He was the father of Tung Chee Hwa, the first chief executive of the Hong Kong SAR.

At the peak of his career, he owned a shipping fleet with over 150 freight ships; his fleet's cargo capacity exceeded 10 million tons.

Career

Tung was born in Dinghai, Zhejiang, on Zhoushan Island. He spent his early business years in Tianjin and Shanghai.

In 1945 Tung bought an old boat, The Heavenly Dragon, which would become his company's flagship and the first Chinese boat to drop anchor at European ports. He moved to Taiwan with the KMT in 1949 and diversified his investments in Hong Kong with the companies Maritime Transport Limited, the Oriental Overseas Container Line, Island Navigation Corporation.

Tung accumulated his fleet of ships over the next few years. In 1959 he built the largest tanker in the world, the 70,000 tonne Oriental Giant, followed by his first new boat in France. In 1973 he purchased the Queen Elizabeth, which he wanted to make into a floating university, an endeavour to later inspire the Semester at Sea programme.

Tung believed in the importance of education. In September 1970, he bought the Cunard ocean liner  to convert it into a floating university S.S. Seawise University to keep the World Campus Afloat programme alive. His goal was to help the UN train maritime specialists. On 9 January 1972, the ship caught fire during refurbishing and sank into Victoria Harbor in Hong Kong on the eve of her inaugural voyage. He did not give up the plan because of this setback. He bought a smaller ocean liner, to complete the plan. He cooperated with various universities (e.g. University of Pittsburgh) to run the academic sea programme with the Institute of Shipboard Education entitled Semester at Sea. In 1979, Tung received the Golden Plate Award of the American Academy of Achievement.

Politically, Tung was aligned with Kuomintang regime of the Republic of China on Taiwan; indeed the company emblem of the OOCL is a plum blossom, the national flower of the Republic of China, and Tung Group was considered the national merchant shipping company of the ROC.  However, when the OOCL experienced financial trouble after his death the government of the People's Republic of China rescued the company. This paved the way for C.Y. Tung's son, Tung Chee Hwa, to become the Chief Executive of the Hong Kong Special Administrative Region of the People's Republic of China in 1997.

References

External links 
 Tung Chao Yung's biography 

1912 births
1982 deaths
Hong Kong shipping businesspeople
Hong Kong billionaires
People from Zhoushan
Billionaires from Zhejiang
Businesspeople from Ningbo
Chinese emigrants to Hong Kong
Chinese diarists
20th-century diarists